The World Student Christian Federation (WSCF) is a federation of autonomous national Student Christian Movements (SCM) forming the youth and student arm of the global ecumenical movement. The Federation includes Orthodox, Protestant, Catholic, Pentecostal and Anglican students.

Together with the YMCA and the YWCA, WSCF has as a foundational document, the Paris Basis. WSCF's aims include "to call members of the academic community to faith in God, to discipleship within the life and mission of the Church and to help them strive for peace and justice in and among nations." At one point "the evangelisation of the world in this generation" was seen as the main aim. Throughout its history the Federation has brought students together across theological and cultural boundaries and provided training and opportunities. For over a century WSCF has supplied leaders to the Church, the ecumenical movement and the Christian left, governments and social movements.

Together the WSCF and SCM provide a context for young Christians from all churches and nations to meet. The motto of the WSCF is ""—"that they all may be one".

History
WSCF was formed at a meeting of student leaders from ten North American and European countries in 1895 at Vadstena Castle, Sweden. The founders included John R. Mott (U.S.), J.Rutter Williamson (U.K.), Martin Eckhoff (Norway), Luther D. Wishard (U.S.), Johannes Siemsen (Germany) and Karl Fries (Sweden).

WSCF was the first international student organisation. Together with YMCA and YWCA, it is among the oldest extant youth movements. WSCF is known in French as FUACE——and in Spanish as FUMEC—.

Forces affecting WSCF have been:
 the rise of the ecumenical movement,
 the turbulence of the 1960s student movements,
 the mid-twentieth century shift in balance of power from liberal to evangelical Christianity,
 the shift in balance of influence within Christianity between the developed and the developing world,
 the pressures of maintaining unity across the spectrum of Christianity

Notable leaders of the WSCF have included:
 John R. Mott
 Nathan Söderblom
 Willem Visser 't Hooft
 Philip Potter
 Alan Brash

The WSCF newsletter Federation News started in 1921 and is published twice a year. The WSCF journal Student World was begun in 1908 but has had a broken history of publication.

Purpose
The mission and vision statement of the WSCF is:
 The WSCF is a global community of Student Christian Movements committed to dialogue, ecumenism, social justice and peace.
 the mission is to empower students in critical thinking and constructive transformation of our world by being a space for:
 Prayer and celebration
 Theological reflection
 Study and analysis of social and cultural processes and
 Solidarity and action across boundaries of culture, gender and ethnicity.
 Through the work of the Holy Spirit, the WSCF is called to be a prophetic witness in church and society. This vision is nurtured by a radical hope for God’s Reign in history.

WSCF's founder, the Methodist layman and YMCA worker John R. Mott (1865-1955), promoted Protestant unity in 1895 as an organization joining youth from all Protestant churches to dedicate themselves to the 'evangelization of the world in this generation.'"

Structure and activities

WSCF globally

The General Assembly (GA) is the highest decision making body of the Federation. WSCF's GA is held approximately every four years. Recent assemblies have been held in Montreal, Canada, Chiang Mai, Thailand, Beirut, Lebanon, and Yamoussoukro, Côte d'Ivoire.

The GA is made up of representatives from all affiliated and associated movements. The GA reviews the previous four years, plans for the next four years and elects the Executive Committee, Chairperson, Vice-Chairpersons, Treasurer and General Secretary.

The 35th GA was held in Bogota, Colombia from February 27 to March 5, 2015.

The Executive Committee and staff (General Secretary and Regional Secretaries) co-ordinate the Federation's activities between General Assemblies. The Executive Committee has met in Chiang Mai, Thailand, Porto Alegre, Brazil and Alexandria, Egypt.

The General Secretary is based in the Inter-Regional Office (IRO) in Geneva, Switzerland. The IRO is in the Ecumenical Centre which also houses the World Council of Churches, the World Alliance of Reformed Churches, the Lutheran World Federation, the Ecumenical Advocacy Alliance, the Conference of European Churches, Ecumenical News International, Action by Churches Together International, and many other organisations.

The IRO organises the General Assembly and Executive Committee, the IRO staff is the secretariat for WSCF's endowment The Centennial Fund. The IRO administers WSCF's income, salaries and fundraising and co-ordinates global WSCF programmes, the IRO administers the Ecumenical Assistance Programme, the Universal Day of Prayer for Students, produces Federation News and Student World maintains contact with national movements and Senior Friends and organises WSCF representation at meetings of the United Nations, UNESCO, World Council of Churches and other organisations.

General Secretaries of WSCF
John R. Mott (USA)1895
Robert C. Mackie (Scotland) 1938-1948
Risto Lehtonen (Finland)
Feliciano Cariño (Philippines)
Emidio Campi (Italy)
Christine Ledger (Australia)and Manuel Quintero(Cuba)
Clarissa Balan (Philippines) and Jean-Claude Deteil (France)
Clarissa Balan (Philippines) and & Kwanga Mabuluki (Zambia) 
Beate Fagerli (Norway) and Lawrence Nana Brew (Ghana)2000-2004
Michael Wallace  (New Zealand) 2004-2010
Christine Housel (USA) 2011-2015
Necta Rocas Montes (Philippines) 2015-2020
Marcelo Leites (Uruguay) 2020-today

WSCF Regions
Until the 1960s, the WSCF was centralized in Geneva. This shifted in 1972, when the Federation divided into six regional offices with Geneva remaining as an inter-regional office. Each region has a regional secretary, officers and a committee made up of representatives from the national movements in the region. Each region has its own programmes and publications. The regions nominate students to participate in global WSCF programmes and other activities. Each region has two representatives on WSCF's global Executive Committee. The six regions are Africa, Asia-Pacific, Europe, Latin America and Caribbean, Middle East, and North America. The regional offices are in Nairobi, Hong Kong, Trento, Buenos Aires, Beirut and New York.

National Student Christian Movements
WSCF's ecumenical work operates at a national level through the Student Christian Movement (SCM). Each national SCM has ties to the ecumenical bodies such as the World Council of Churches, and other national ecumenical organizations such as the National Council of Churches in Australia and the Christian Conference of Asia.

Whilst national SCMs may vary considerably, they have tended to foster liberal and progressive religious and social views amongst university students. This resulted in conflicts with evangelical student groups, such as those affiliated to the parachurch International Fellowship of Evangelical Students.

National SCMs include the Student Christian Movement of Great Britain, Student Christian Movement of the Philippines, Student Christian Movement of Canada, and Indonesian Christian Student Movement.

Related organisations
World Council of Churches
 YMCA
 YWCA
World University Service

Notable members
 Bishop George Bell
 Steve Biko
 Dietrich Bonhöffer
 Bishop Charles Brent 
 Inga-Brita Castrén (Finnish theologian, Secretary to Africa 1959-1962)
 Willem Visser 't Hooft (First General Secretary of the World Council of Churches)
 Bishop Penny Jamieson
 Samuel Kobia (Sixth General Secretary of the World Council of Churches)
 Jürgen Moltmann
 Edouard Chivambo Mondlane (President of FRELIMO)
 John R. Mott (Nobel Peace Prize 1946)
 Bishop Lesslie Newbigin
 Kwame Nkrumah
 Mwalimu Julius Nyerere
 Mercy Oduyoye (African theologian)
 Joseph Oldham
 Philip Potter (Third General Secretary of the World Council of Churches)
 Radius Prawiro (Minister of Finance  of Indonesia)
 Frère Roger of the Taizé community
 Nancy Ruth Canadian Senator
 Archbishop Ted Scott
 Ellen Johnson Sirleaf President of Liberia
 Amir Sjarifuddin (Former Prime Minister of Indonesia)
 Archbishop Nathan Söderblom (Nobel Peace Prize 1930)
 Oliver Tambo
 William Temple
 M. M. Thomas (Indian theologian)
 Bishop K. H. Ting (Chinese Bishop)
 Archbishop Anders Wejryd
 Lois Miriam Wilson (Canadian Senator)

References

External links
 WSCF/FUMEC/FUACE global website

Christian youth organizations
Christian ecumenical organizations
Student organizations established in 1895
International student religious organizations
World Christianity
1895 establishments in Sweden